Psilocybe Larvae is a Russian melodic death metal metal band based in Saint Petersburg. It was formed in 1996 at Vyborg.  The band was led by Vitaly Belobritsky but the band has gone through various changes since it was formed.

History 
The story of Psilocybe Larvae started in 1996 in the Russian city of Vyborg, when Vitaly "Larv" Belobritsky (vocals/guitar), Denis Vinogradov (guitar), Oleg Peshkichev (bass) and Eugene Ushakov (drums) formed the band to indulge their passion for melodic and haunting death/dark metal.

After recording the first demo, "Liar", in the very same year the band soon entered a professional studio to record a song for the "Russian Alternative Extreme Music" sampler. Drum parts for that song were provided by Ilya "Alan" Piyaev (Azeroth, Painful Memories) as Eugene decided to leave the band just before recording. The compilation including Psilocybe Larvae's "Death Is Not the End" was released in 1998.

Following a short interlude with Metallization's Eugene Golubkov, Psilocybe Larvae finally found a permanent drummer in 1999 when Alan took over drum duties. The new line-up entered the studio again in mid-2000 to record their first full-length Stigmata. This self-released effort garnered some favorable feedback including the "demo of the month" award in Germany's Legacy magazine, so Black Side Productions decided to re-release Stigmata on CD in 2001.

Meanwhile, the band underwent further line-up changes with Andrey replacing Denis on guitars and Den joining the band as keyboardist. The year 2002 saw Psilocybe Larvae contributing two cover songs to Manowar and Chimera tributes, but more importantly, the band finally finished recording their second album. Agony was released by Black Side Productions at the beginning of 2003.

The following months dealt another blow to the line-up, as Oleg's addictions started to get out of hand. For that reason, the band decided to part ways with him in December 2004, leaving Psilocybe Larvae without a bass player for quite some time.

A "silver lining" appeared in 2005 when Russia's major label CD-Maximum agreed to remaster and re-release the two albums with bonus tracks. The band also found a new bass player in Alex "Liga" Legotin but unfortunately, there was new trouble ahead: after a few months, Alex had to leave the group. Keyboardist Den was fired as well and in the fall of 2005 the band was eventually forced to relocate to St. Petersburg with no stable line-up in what looked like a semi-hiatus. Things were slowly falling apart.

In St. Petersburg, Alex re-joined the ranks and keyboardist Dmitry "Chaos" Orekhov completed the line-up to release the band from its forced inactivity. After headlining the Ukrainian "Triple Interaction" tour in autumn 2006, the band entered DDT Records in January 2007 to record their third album, Non-existence. It was mixed at Studio Hertz (Poland), mastered at Cutting Room (Sweden), and finally released in February 2008 by Moscow label Mazzar Records. In March, the band headlined a Russian "Non-existent" tour to support the new album.

During 2008, the band continued to promote Non-existence by doing shows in Russia and taking part in a Belarus tour named "Creative Breath of Death" together with Katalepsy, Deathbringer and Thelema.

In 2009, Psilocybe Larvae signed to Dark Harvest Records (USA) for an international release of Non-existence and started songwriting for future releases.

After two years of intensive work, the band returned with a new album called The Labyrinth Of Penumbra. The recording and mixing process took place at studio Kontakt under the guidance of Yury Smirnov. The mastering duties were handled by Mats Lindfors at Cutting Room and cover art was taken care of A-Ra Design and W. Smerdulak.  In 2012 the band found a new label and The Labyrinth Of Penumbra was released by Buil2Kill Records/Nadir Music (Italy). 
With great success, the band played many gigs in Russia, Baltic States and Finland to promote the album.

The beginning of 2013 was marked by the signing of an agreement with Albagi Music Promotion in terms of helping the band with the promotion in Germany. 
Psilocybe Larvae continued its concert activity in support of the new album; they went on 6 days tour of Belarus "Penumbra Divisus Tour" in February and "Tour By Fire" including 8 cities in Poland and Czech Republic in November. In summer, the band took part in the biggest Estonian open-air festival Hard Rock Laager sharing the stage with Testament, Marduk and others.

At the same time another line-up change happened. The band parted ways with guitarist Andrey "Luke" Lukashkov and drummer Ilya "Alan" Piyaev. Konstantin Kot'h (guitar) and Evgeny "Evg" Trefilov (drums) from industrial metal band Vergeltung came on board as the new members of Psilocybe Larvae.

Throughout 2014 and 2015 Psilocybe Larvae went through several major line-up changes again: they split with Kot’h and Evg, Liga departed and returned after a while, a new drummer Alexander Yakovlev (Misanthrope Count Merciful, Thartaria) was recruited, and a new guitar player Roman "Dorian" Kondratev (Refawn, Tophet) joined.
Due to personal reasons Alexander left Psilocybe Larvae in 2015 and the band's former drummer Alan took up his place behind the drum kit once again.
With the renewed line-up Psilocybe Larvae played at Wave-Gotik-Treffen Festival in Germany, Dobry Festival in Slovakia and Metalurg open-air festival in Russia in 2016/2017.

In 2018, a new single "The Fall Of Icarus" was released digitally and a lyric video followed it up. The song was also presented at two European open-airs: Metalshow.lv in Latvia and Meltdown Festival in Germany.

During the process of recording a new album in 2019, the band parted ways with Dorian and Alan. Alex Yakovlev replaced Alan on drums again and Anton Veresov (Buicide, Severnye Vrata) filled in for Dorian on guitar.
The new album was finished in 2020. Recorded in different studios in St.Petersburg, mixed by the band's friend Dmitry Vasiliev in Moscow and mastered by renowned engineer Thomas Eberger in Stockholm Mastering the album got the title Where Silence Dwells.

Invigorated with the new line-up and a new album scheduled for release at the end of 2021, Psilocybe Larvae resumed their concert activity celebrating the 25th band anniversary in their hometown Vyborg and taking part in the open-air festival Тьма (Darkness) in the woods near St. Petersburg. Currently, work is underway on an upcoming album release.

Members 
Current members

 Vit "Larv" Belobritsky (vocals, guitar)
 Alex "Liga" Legotin (bass)
 Anton Veresov (guitar)
 Aleksander Yakovlev (drums)

Former members

Denis Vinogradov (guitar)
Evgeniy Golubkov (drums)
Evgeniy Ushakov (drums)
Evgeniy Trefilov (drums)
Roman "Dorian" Kondratev (guitar)
Dmitriy Orekhov (keyboards)
Oleg Peshkichev (bass)
Konstantin Kot'h (guitar)
Andrei Lukashkov (guitar)
Ilia "Alan" Piyaev (drums)

Discography

Albums

1996 - Liar Demo (Self prod.)
2000 - "'Stigmata MC (Self prod.)
2001 - Stigmata CD (Black Side prod.)
2003 - Agony CD, MC (Black Side prod.)
2005 - Stigmata & Agony CD (CD-Maximum — Russia) re-released
2008 - Non-Existence CD (Mazzar Records — Russia, Ukraine, Belarus)
2009 - Non-Existence CD (Dark Harvest Records — world)
2012 - The Labyrinth of Penumbra CD (Buil2Kill Records / Nadir Music — world)
2021 - Where Silence Dwells'' CD (Red Rivet Records / Fono Ltd.)

Singles

2018 - "The Fall Of Icarus" (digital release - world)

Compilations

1998 - CD,MC  "Russian Alternative Extreme Music"  "Death is not the End" song
2002 - CD "Vampiria" magazine "Stigmata" song
2003 - CD "Black Hole" magazine "Agony" song
2004 - CD "Buckets Of Blood" vol.2 (Bloodbucket Productions) "Out Of Sanity" song
2004 - CD "Manowar Russian Tribute" (Piranha Records) "Blood Of The Kings" cover
2006 - MC "Total Jazz - Tribute to Chimera" (Карма Мира Records/Outcry Records) "Karma Of The World" song
2006 - DVD "Rock Palace Open-Air ' 05" 1 song
2007 - DVD "Rock Palace Open-Air ' 06" 2 songs
2008 - CD "Total Jazz - Tribute to Chimera" (Карма Мира Records/Kap-kan Records) "Karma Of The World" song
2008 - CD "Hell On Fire" compilation "Sleepwalkers" song

Concerts
The band has opened for:

Norther - SPb, Arctica club, 2006г.
Anathema - SPb, Orlandina club, 2007г.
Swallow the sun - SPb, Petrodoom festival, 2008г.
Sadist - SPb, Orlandina club, 2010г.
Blindead - mini tour: SPb - Moscow, 2011г.
Vesania - SPb, Orlandina club, 2011г.
Kypck - SPb, Zal club, 2014г.

Festivals
Night Voyage festival, Vyborg - 1996–1998, 2004, 2007, 2010
Rock Palace, Pushkin, Saint Petersburg - 2005, 2006
Hard Rock Laager open-air festival, Vana-Vigala - 2013
Wave-Gotik-Treffen, Leipzig - 2016
Dobry open-air festival, Prešov  - 2016
Metalurg open-air festival, Olenegorsk - 2017
Metalshow.lv open-air festival, Ekabpils - 2018
Meltdown open-air festival, Schuby - 2018
Тьма open-air festival, Vyborgsky district of the Leningrad region - 2021

References

External links
Official site
Facebook page
Vkontakte page
Bandcamp page
Youtube chanel
Instagram page
Spotify profile
Soundcloud page

Musical groups established in 1996
Musical quartets
Russian death metal musical groups
Russian progressive metal musical groups
Doom metal musical groups